The Foldy–Wouthuysen transformation was historically significant and was formulated by Leslie Lawrance Foldy and Siegfried Adolf Wouthuysen in 1949 to understand the nonrelativistic limit of the Dirac equation, the equation for spin-½ particles. A detailed general discussion of the Foldy–Wouthuysen-type transformations in particle interpretation of relativistic wave equations is in Acharya and Sudarshan (1960). Its utility in high energy physics  is now limited due to the primary applications being in the ultra-relativistic domain where the Dirac field is treated as a quantised field.

A canonical transform
The FW transformation is a unitary transformation of the orthonormal basis in which both the Hamiltonian and the state are represented. The eigenvalues do not change under such a unitary transformation, that is, the physics does not change under such a unitary basis transformation. Therefore, such a unitary transformation can always be applied: in particular a unitary basis transformation may be picked which will put the Hamiltonian in a more pleasant form, at the expense of a change in the state function, which then represents something else. See for example the Bogoliubov transformation, which is an orthogonal basis transform for the same purpose. The suggestion that the FW transform is applicable to the state or the Hamiltonian is thus not correct.

Foldy and Wouthuysen made use of a canonical transform that has now come to be known as the Foldy–Wouthuysen transformation.  A brief account of the history of the transformation is to be found in the obituaries of Foldy and Wouthuysen and the biographical memoir of Foldy. Before their work, there was some difficulty in understanding and gathering all the interaction terms of a given order, such as those for a Dirac particle immersed in an external field.  With their procedure the physical interpretation of the terms was clear, and it became possible to apply their work in a systematic way to a number of problems that had previously defied solution. The Foldy–Wouthuysen transform was extended to the physically important cases of spin-0 and spin-1 particles, and even generalized to the case of arbitrary spins.

Description

The Foldy–Wouthuysen (FW) transformation is a unitary transformation on a fermion wave function of the form:

where the unitary operator is the 4 × 4 matrix:

Above,

is the unit vector oriented in the direction of the fermion momentum. The inverse

so it is clear that , where  is a 4 × 4 identity matrix.

Transforming the Dirac Hamiltonian for a free fermion

This transformation is of particular interest when applied to the free-fermion Dirac Hamiltonian operator

in biunitary fashion, in the form:

Using the commutativity properties of the Dirac matrices, this can be massaged over into the double-angle expression:

This factors out into:

Choosing a particular representation: Newton–Wigner

One particularly important representation, is that in which the transformed Hamiltonian operator  is diagonalized. Such a representation is specified by defining:

so that  is reduced to the diagonalized (this presupposes that  is taken in the Dirac–Pauli representation (after Paul Dirac and Wolfgang Pauli) in which it is a diagonal matrix):

By elementary trigonometry,  also implies that:

so that using  in  now leads following reduction to:

Prior to Foldy and Wouthuysen publishing their transformation, it was already known that  is the Hamiltonian in the Newton–Wigner (NW) representation (named after Theodore Duddell Newton and Eugene Wigner) of the Dirac equation. See this link.

Correspondence between the Dirac–Pauli and Newton–Wigner representations, for a fermion at rest

Therefore, any operator  in the Dirac–Pauli representation upon which we perform a biunitary transformation, will be given, for an at-rest fermion, by:

Contrasting the original Dirac–Pauli Hamiltonian operator

with the NW Hamiltonian , we do indeed find the  "at rest" correspondence:

Transforming the velocity operator

In the Dirac–Pauli representation

Now, consider the velocity operator.  To obtain this operator, we must commute the Hamiltonian operator  with the canonical position operators , i.e., we must calculate

One good way to approach this calculation, is to start by writing the scalar rest mass  as

Thus, we may write:

where we have made use of the Heisenberg canonical commutation relationship  to reduce terms.

Because the canonical relationship

the above provides the basis for computing an inherent, non-zero acceleration operator, which specifies the oscillatory motion known as zitterbewegung.

In the Newton–Wigner representation

In the Newton–Wigner representation, we now wish to calculate

If we use the result at the very end of section 2 above, then this can be written instead as:

First, to accommodate the square root, we will wish to require that the scalar square mass  commute with the canonical coordinates , which we write as:

where we again use the Heisenberg canonical relationship . It is straightforward to verify that:

will satisfy  when again employing . Now, we simply return the  factor via , to arrive at:

This is understood to be the velocity operator in the Newton–Wigner representation. Because:

it is commonly thought that the zitterbewegung motion arising out of  vanishes when a fermion is transformed into the Newton–Wigner representation.

Other applications

The powerful machinery of the Foldy–Wouthuysen transform originally developed for the Dirac equation has found applications in many situations such as acoustics, and optics.

It has found applications in very diverse areas such as atomic systems synchrotron radiation and derivation of the Bloch equation for polarized beams.

The application of the Foldy–Wouthuysen transformation in acoustics is very natural; comprehensive and mathematically rigorous accounts.

In the traditional scheme the purpose of expanding the optical Hamiltonian

in a series using

as the expansion parameter is to understand the propagation of the quasi-paraxial beam in terms of a series of approximations (paraxial plus nonparaxial). Similar is the situation in the case of charged-particle optics.  Let us recall that in relativistic quantum mechanics too one has a similar problem of understanding the relativistic wave equations as the nonrelativistic approximation plus the relativistic correction terms in the quasi-relativistic regime. For the Dirac equation (which is first-order in time) this is done most conveniently using the Foldy–Wouthuysen transformation leading to an iterative diagonalization technique. The main framework of the newly developed formalisms of optics (both light optics and charged-particle optics) is based on the transformation technique of Foldy–Wouthuysen theory which casts the Dirac equation in a form displaying the different interaction terms between the Dirac particle and an applied electromagnetic field in a nonrelativistic and easily interpretable form.

In the Foldy–Wouthuysen theory the Dirac equation is decoupled through a canonical transformation into two two-component equations: one reduces to the Pauli equation in the nonrelativistic limit and the other describes the negative-energy states. It is possible to write a Dirac-like matrix representation of Maxwell's equations. In such a matrix form the Foldy–Wouthuysen can be applied.

There is a close algebraic analogy between the Helmholtz equation (governing scalar optics) and the Klein–Gordon equation; and between the matrix form of the Maxwell's equations (governing vector optics) and the Dirac equation. So it is natural to use the powerful machinery of standard quantum mechanics (particularly, the Foldy–Wouthuysen transform) in analyzing these systems.

The suggestion to employ the Foldy–Wouthuysen Transformation technique in the case of the Helmholtz equation was mentioned in the literature as a remark.

It was only in the recent works, that this idea was exploited to analyze the quasiparaxial approximations for specific beam optical system. The Foldy–Wouthuysen technique is ideally suited for the Lie algebraic approach to optics. With all these plus points, the powerful and ambiguity-free expansion, the Foldy–Wouthuysen Transformation is still little used in optics. The technique of the Foldy–Wouthuysen Transformation results in what is known as nontraditional prescriptions of Helmholtz optics and Maxwell optics respectively. The nontraditional approaches give rise to very interesting wavelength-dependent modifications of the paraxial and aberration behaviour. The nontraditional formalism of Maxwell optics provides a unified framework of light beam optics and polarization. The nontraditional prescriptions of light optics are closely analogous with the quantum theory of
charged-particle beam optics. In optics, it has enabled the deeper connections in the wavelength-dependent regime between light optics and charged-particle optics to be seen (see Electron optics).

See also

Relativistic quantum mechanics

Notes

Fermions
Dirac equation